Michael Wykeham Perry (born 16 May 1944) is a former Australian rules football player who played in the VFL between 1965 and 1969 for the Richmond Football Club.

Family
The son of Charles Wykeham William Perry (1910-), and Edith Rhoda Jean Perry (1916-), née McLeod, Michael Wykeham Perry was born at the Margaret Coles Maternity Hospital, in Prahran, Victoria. on 16 May 1944.

Education
Educated at Scotch College from 1958 to 1962.

Football

Old Scotch Collegians (VAFA)
Perry played two seasons for Scotch Old Collegians Football Club in the Victorian Amateur Football Association (1963 and 1964, 38 games). He won their Best and Fairest Trophy each season, and was selected for the VAFA Representative side in 1964 (at 20 years of age).

Richmond VFL
Recruited by Richmond in 1965, he eventually became a fixture at centre-half-back, and fans got used to seeing his mop of red hair flying above the pack, as well as being delighted by his tenacious clearing dashes. He was tall, strongly built, and had wonderful judgement. His ball sense was quite remarkable, and he always made rather hard tasks seem much simpler than they were.

In Perry's second senior match, against St Kilda on 1 May 1965, his jaw was broken, and did not play another senior match that season.

By 1967 he was a fixture in the Richmond side at centre half-back. He was centre half-back in Richmond's first premiership team since 1944, when Richmond beat Geelong 16.18 (114) to 15.15 (105).

He was centre half-back for the Victorian State team that defeated Western Australia, 20.15 (135) to 11.16 (82), on the MCG on 17 June 1967.

He played the entire 1968 and 1969 seasons for Richmond's senior side, missing Richmond's 1969 Grand Final winning team because of a four-game suspension for striking Footscray's Tad Joniec in the last home-and-away match of the 1969 season.

After 1969
Although he was unable to play any more senior grade VFL due to an injury, he continued to play satisfactorily at a lower level for a number of years:
 1970: Richmond Reserves.
 1971: Richmond Reserves, including the 1971 Reserves Premiership (thus, from 1965 to the end of 1971, Mike had played 1 Victorian Representative game, 53 senior games, and 45 reserve games).
 1972: Dandenong Football Club, 11 games.
 1976–1977: Portland, captain-coach, 36 games.
 1978–1979: Power House VAFA Football Club, captain-coach.
 1980–1984: Old Geelong Grammarians VAFA Football Club, captain-coach.

Total
Including his time with Old Scotch Collegians, and his VAFA and VFL selection, he played a total of 281 games in his career (continuing to play until he was 40).

Advertising
Whilst at Richmond, Mike worked for an advertising agency.

His most memorable piece of work being the famous slogan he devised to sell Captain Morgan Rum: "Captain Morgan is good for your organ"!

Needless to say, with the newspaper, radio and television coverage, added to a slogan-covered Moomba Procession Float that was overflowing with lustful pirates and nubile wenches, the sales of Captain Morgan Rum skyrocketed with his campaign.

He went on to conduct a photography business, and became involved in the Richmond Former Players' and Officials' Association.

Footnotes

References
 Jellie, Dugald, "Oh We're from Tigerland: Mike Perry", www.richmondfc.com.au.
 Hansen B: Tigerland, Richmond Past Players and Officials Assoc, (Melbourne), 1992.
 Hogan P: The Tigers of Old, Richmond FC, (Melbourne), 1996.

External links
 
 
 Tigerland profile: Mike Perry
 Mike Perry: Boyles Football Photos.

Living people
1944 births
Richmond Football Club players
Richmond Football Club Premiership players
Old Scotch Football Club players
Portland Football Club players
Australian rules footballers from Victoria (Australia)
Australian advertising executives
Australian photographers
Photographers from Melbourne
People educated at Scotch College, Melbourne
One-time VFL/AFL Premiership players